Breweries in Connecticut produce a wide range of beers in different styles that are marketed locally, regionally, nationally, and internationally. In 2012 Connecticut's 22 breweries and brewpubs employed 430 people directly, and 12,000 others in related jobs such as wholesaling and retailing. Including people directly employed in brewing, as well as those who supply Connecticut's breweries with everything from ingredients to machinery, the total business and personal tax revenue generated by Connecticut's breweries and related industries was more than $375 million. Consumer purchases of Connecticut's brewery products generated another $105 million in tax revenue. In 2012, according to the Brewers Association, Connecticut ranked 33rd in the number of craft breweries per capita with 21.

For context, at the end of 2013 there were 2,822 breweries in the United States, including 2,768 craft breweries subdivided into 1,237 brewpubs, 1,412 microbreweries and 119 regional craft breweries.  In that same year, according to the Beer Institute, the brewing industry employed around 43,000 Americans in brewing and distribution and had a combined economic impact of more than $246 billion.

Connecticut breweries

Alvarium Beer Company – New Britain
Area Two Experimental Brewing – Stratford
Aspetuck Brew Lab – Bridgeport
Back East Brewing Company – Bloomfield
Bad Sons Beer Company – Derby
Barley Head Brewery – Mystic
Beaver Beer Company – Greens Farms
Beer'd Brewing Company – Stonington
Black Hog Brewing Company – Oxford
Black Pond Brews – Danielson
Brass Work Brewing Company – Waterbury
Brewery Legitimus – New Hartford
Brewport Brewing Co. – Bridgeport
Broad Brook Brewing Company – East Windsor
Charter Oak Brewing Company – Danbury
City Steam Brewery Cafe – Hartford
Cliffside Brewing – Wallingford
Cottrell Brewing Company – Pawcatuck
Cold Creek Brewery – Ellington
Connecticut Valley Brewing Company – South Windsor
Counter Weight Brewing Company – Hamden
DuVig Brewing Company  – Branford
East Rock Brewing Company – New Haven
Fat Orange Cat Brew Co. – East Hampton
Firefly Hollow Brewing Company – Bristol
Five Churches Brewing – New Britain
Forest City Brewing – Middletown
Front Porch Brewing – Wallingford
Fox Farm Brewery – Salem
Great Falls Brewing Company – North Canaan
Half Full Brewery – Stamford
Hanging Hills Brewing Company - Hartford
Hog River Brewing Company – Hartford
Iron Brewing – Norwalk
Kent Falls Brewing Company – Kent
Kinsmen Brewing Company – Southington
Lock City Brewery – Stamford
Milford Point Brewing – Milford
New England Brewing Company – Woodbridge
New Park Brewing – West Hartford
Nod Hill Brewery – Ridgefield
OEC Brewing – Oxford
Overshores Brewing Company – East Haven
Powder Hollow Brewery – Enfield
Redding Beer Company - Redding, Connecticut
Relic Brewing Company – Plainville
Still Hill Brewery  – Rocky Hill
Stony Creek Brewery – Branford
Stubborn Beauty  – Middletown
Thimble Island Brewing Company – Branford
These Guys Brewing – Norwich
Thomas Hooker Brewing Company – Bloomfield
Top Shelf Brewing Company (out of business) – Manchester
Two Roads Brewing Company – Stratford
Urban Lodge Brewing Company - Manchester
Willimantic Brewing Company – Willimantic
Witchdoctor Brewing Company – Southington
Woodbury Brewing Company – Woodbury

See also 
 Connecticut Beer Map
 Beer in the United States
 List of breweries in the United States
 List of microbreweries

References

Connecticut
Lists of companies based in Connecticut
Breweries